Václav Rabas (13 November 1885 in Krušovice – 26 October 1954 in Prague) was a Czechoslovak painter.

References

1885 births
1954 deaths
Czechoslovak painters
People from Rakovník District